Thuppakki is a 2012 Indian Tamil-language action thriller film written and directed by AR Murugadoss. Produced by Kalaipuli S. Thanu under his studio V Creations and distributed by Gemini Film Circuit, the film stars Vijay and Kajal Aggarwal, with Sathyan, Vidyut Jammwal and Jayaram in supporting roles. The film's music was composed by Harris Jayaraj with cinematography handled by Santosh Sivan and editing done by A. Sreekar Prasad. It revolves around Jagadish Dhanapal (Vijay) an Indian Army officer on a mission to track down, destroy and deactivate a sleeper cell, after witnessing and barely escaping a bomb blast executed by the cell.

S. Saraswathi of Rediff stated that it was the first Tamil film to cross  mark. Furthermore, the film won 19 awards from 57 nominations, mostly for the performances, soundtrack, score, cinematography, scripting, direction and other major technical aspects.

At the 60th Filmfare Awards South, Thuppakki received seven nominations in the Tamil branch, including Best Film, Best Director (Murugadoss) and Best Actor (Vijay), but did not win in any category. It received ten nominations at the 2nd South Indian International Movie Awards and won four: Best Actress – Critics (Aggarwal), Best Actor in a Negative Role (Jammwal), Best Music Director (Harris Jayaraj) and Best Fight Choreographer Kaecha Kampakdee. The film received 16 nominations at the 7th Vijay Awards and won 6 awards; the highest in the award ceremony – with five from the favourite awards branch and an Entertainer of the Year award for Vijay. Among other wins, the film received a Chennai Times Film Award for Best Film, an Ananda Vikatan Cinema Award for Best Actor (Vijay), CineMAA Award for Aggarwal and three Edison Awards.

Awards and nominations

See also 
 List of Tamil films of 2012

Notes

References

External links 
 Accolades for Thuppakki at the Internet Movie Database

Lists of accolades by Indian film